The knockout stage of the 2020 AFF Championship was the second and final stage of the 2020 AFF Championship, following the group stage. It was played from 22 December 2021 to 1 January 2022. The top two teams from each group (four in total) advanced to the knockout stage to compete in a  two-legged single-elimination tournament beginning with the semi-finals followed by the final.

Qualified teams
The top two highest-placing teams from each of the two groups advanced to the knockout stage.

Schedule
The schedule of each round is as follows.

Format 
All ties were played over two legs. The team that scored more goals on aggregate over the two legs won the tie. The away goals rule was not used in this edition, as the tournament was hosted in a centralized venue, which was Singapore. If the aggregate score was level at the end of normal time of the second leg, extra time was played, and if the same amount of goals were scored by both teams during extra time, the tie was decided by a penalty shoot-out.

Bracket

Semi-finals

|}

First leg

Singapore vs Indonesia

Vietnam vs Thailand

Second leg

Indonesia vs Singapore

Thailand vs Vietnam

Final

|}

First leg

Second leg

Notes

References

External links
 AFF Suzuki Cup Official website

Knockout stage